This is a list of defunct airlines of Canada.

See also

 List of airlines of Canada
 List of airports in Canada

References

Canada
Airlines
Airlines, defunct